Tepeapulco is a town and one of the 84 municipalities of Hidalgo, in central-eastern Mexico.The municipality covers an area of 239 km².

As of 2005, the municipality had a total population of 49,850. 

During the Spanish colonial period it was part of the domain of the alcaldia mayor of Apa y Tepeapulco.  The parish of San Francisco Tepeapulco was established in 1527.

References

Municipalities of Hidalgo (state)
Populated places in Hidalgo (state)